The Louisiana Fuel was a football team in the Independent Women's Football League based in Baton Rouge, Louisiana.  Home games were played at the Zachary High School in nearby Zachary.

Season-By-Season 

|-
| colspan="6" align="center" | Baton Rouge Women's Tackle (IWFL)
|-
|2007 || 1 || 6 || 0 || 3rd West Midsouth || --
|-
| colspan="6" align="center" | Louisiana Fuel (IWFL)
|-
|2008 || 1 || 7 || 0 || 3rd Tier II Midsouth || --
|-
|2009 || 0 || 6 || 0 || 20th Tier II || --
|-
|2010* || 1 || 2 || 0 || 6th Tier II East Southeast || --
|-
!Totals || 8 || 34 || 0
|colspan="2"| 

* = Current Standing

Season Schedules

2009

2010

** = Won by forfeit

External links
 Louisiana Fuel official website
 IWFL official website

Independent Women's Football League
East Baton Rouge Parish, Louisiana
Fuel
2005 establishments in Louisiana
American football teams established in 2005